The Dani or Baliem Valley languages are a family of clearly related Trans–New Guinea languages spoken by the Dani and related peoples in the Baliem Valley in the Highland Papua, Indonesia. Foley (2003) considers their TNG status to be established. They may be most closely related to the languages of Paniai Lakes, but this is not yet clear. Capell (1962) had posited that their closest relatives were the Kwerba languages, which Ross (2005) rejects.

Languages
Larson (1977) divided the family into three branches based on lexicostatistics, and Nggem was later added as a fourth. The Ngalik languages are very poorly attested.

 Dani family
 Wano
Nggem
 Central Dani: Grand Valley Dani (upper, lower, and mid dialects), Hupla, Western Dani–Walak
 Ngalik: Nduga, Silimo, Yali (dialect cluster)

Phonemes
Usher (2020) reconstructs the consonant inventory as follows. This is identical to the reconstruction of Bromley (1966-1967) apart from adding the rare consonants *pw, *mbw and the possible additional vowel *ɐ.

{| 
| *m || || *n ||  ||  ||
|-
| *p || *pʷ || *t || || *k || *kʷ
|-
| *mb || *mbʷ || *nd || || *ŋg || *ŋgʷ
|-
| *ɓ || || *ɗ ||  || ||
|-
| *w || || *l || *j ||  || 
|}

{| 
|*i|| ||*u
|-
|*ɪ|| ||*ʊ
|-
|*e||[*ɐ]||*o
|-
| ||*a||
|}

And the diphthongs *ei, *ou, *ai, *au.

Pronouns
Ross (1995) reconstructs the independent pronouns and possessive/object prefixes of Central Dani as:

{| class="wikitable"
! !!singular!!plural
|-
!1
|*an, *n[a]||*ni-t, *nin[a]-
|-
!2
|*ka-t, *k[a]||*ki-t, *kin[a]-
|-
!3
|*a-t, *∅/w-||*i-t, *in[a]-
|}

Vocabulary comparison
The following basic vocabulary words are from Bromley (1967) and Voorhoeve (1975), as cited in the Trans-New Guinea database:

Evolution
Dani reflexes of proto-Trans-New Guinea (pTNG) etyma are:

Grand Valley Dani language:
  'man' < 
  'tongue' < 
  'hair' <  ( is 1sg possessor)
  'come' < 
  'new' < 

Western Dani language:
  'man' < 
  < 
  'tongue' < 
  'new' < 
  'leg' < 
  'skin' < 
  'tree' < 

Ngalik language:
  'tree' < 
  'breast' < 
  'full' < 
  'smoke' <

References 

 

 
West Papuan Highlands languages
Languages of western New Guinea